Arpad Alexander Vass (born August 30, 1959) is a research scientist and forensic anthropologist. He is also a teaching associate with the Law Enforcement Innovation Center, which is part of the University of Tennessee's Institute for Public Service.

Vass is the son of a Hungarian immigrant. He grew up in Arlington, Virginia, where he graduated from Yorktown High School in 1977. He is married to Victoria Ann Longo and they have two sons.

Education and research
In 1980, Vass obtained the Antarctic Exploration certification from Scripps Institution of Oceanography. The following year, he earned a Bachelor of Science degree in Biology from Virginia Tech. In 1984, Vass earned a Medical Technology degree from Fairfax Hospital. He earned a Masters of Science degree in Forensic Science from Virginia Commonwealth University in 1989, and he obtained his PhD from the University of Tennessee in anthropology.

Vass is developing a forensic science technique called "decomposition odor analysis", or "DOA", which he claims will help to identify the over 400 body vapors which emanate from a decaying and decomposing human body.  A database of such vapors would in theory enable the Federal Bureau of Investigation's search teams and cadaver dogs (Human Remains Detection dogs) to detect the location of remains of human beings. The database is a part of the University of Tennessee Anthropological Research Facility. These dogs train in the same method as narcotic dogs can sniff out graves of buried human remains.

Vass has also put forward a proposal to search out human remains with the use of a fly with a tracking chip.

Vass is developing a forensic tool to help detect and uncover forensic cases. The Forensic Anthropology Facility, located behind the UT Medical Center in Knoxville, affords scientists with bodies which have been willed to the study of forensic science and research. The molecular signature of body decomposition odor may be detected by analytical equipment or electronic body sniffer which is being researched by Vass.

Selected publications

See also
 Forensic entomological decomposition

References

External links
 Curriculum Vitae for Arpad Vass
 Anthropology Dissertation of Arpad Vass

1959 births
Living people
American anthropologists
American people of Hungarian descent
Yorktown High School (Virginia) alumni
Oak Ridge National Laboratory people
People from Arlington County, Virginia
People from Flemington, New Jersey
Virginia Commonwealth University alumni
Virginia Tech alumni
University of Tennessee alumni
University of Tennessee faculty
Scientists from Tennessee